Hassina Louadj (6 December 1957 – 15 November 1994), known mononymously as Zoulikha, was an Algerian singer of Chaoui music popular in the 1970s.

Like the singer Teldja, active at the same period, she revived traditional Berber songs for a new generation.

References

1957 births
1994 deaths
20th-century Algerian women singers
Berber musicians
People from Khenchela